A bondage corset, used for activities of or relating to bondage, is a full-figured corset that is sometimes called a discipline corset.

A bondage corset is very long, rigid, and restricting.  It is constructed to place severe limitations on the wearer's movements.  It generally extends to just above the knees, and is constructed to be laced very tightly.

These corsets are often designed to be worn for long periods of time, including overnight and while sleeping.  If they are not designed as such, they can be extremely uncomfortable if fallen asleep in.

See also
 History of corsets
 Hourglass corset
 Training corset
 Charles Guyette
 Redresseur corset

References

Corsetry
Fetish clothing